Non-solid or nonsolid may refer to:

 Non-solid, anything not in a solid state of matter
 Non-solid archive format, in solid compression computer file data compression
 In computer graphics, a non-solid is a virtual object that does not collide with other objects (see collision detection)
 Non-solid projection screen, in video technology